Zorko Prelovec was a Slovene composer, well known for his choral works and Lieder.   He was also active as a choral conductor, leading the Ljubljana Mercury choir from 1900.  It has been said that he was a musical poet and that his compositions for choirs are filled with a soft, tender sentimentality.

References

External links

1887 births
1939 deaths
Slovenian composers
Male composers
People from Idrija
Slovenian male musicians